The District of Columbia is a political division coterminous with Washington, D.C., the capital city of the United States. Since the enactment of the 23rd amendment to the Constitution in 1961, the district has participated in 15 presidential elections. The amendment states that it cannot have more electoral votes than the state with the smallest number of electors. Since then, it has been allocated three electoral votes in every presidential election. The Democratic Party has immense political strength in the district. In each of the 15 presidential elections, the district has overwhelmingly voted for the Democratic candidate, with no margin less than 56.5 percentage points. It has been won by the losing candidate in 8 of the 15 elections.

In the 2000 presidential election, Barbara Lett-Simmons, an elector from the district, left her ballot blank to protest its lack of voting representation in Congress. As a result, Al Gore received only two of the three electoral votes from Washington, D.C. In 2016, 85.7% of the registered voters approved a statehood referendum. In recent times, there have been various statehood movements in the District of Columbia, which advocates making the district a state.

The district is a signatory of the National Popular Vote Interstate Compact, an interstate compact in which signatories award all of their electoral votes to the winner of the national-level popular vote in a presidential election, even if another candidate won an individual signatory's popular vote.  it has not yet gone into force.

Presidential elections

Graph
The following graph shows the margin of victory of the Democratic Party over the Republican Party in the 15 presidential elections the District of Columbia participated.

See also
 Elections in the District of Columbia
 United States House of Representatives elections in the District of Columbia
 United States Senate elections in the District of Columbia
 List of United States presidential election results by state

Notes

References

Works cited